All India Kisan Sangarsh Coordination Committee   (Abbreviated AIKSCC) is a pan-Indian umbrella organisation comprising 250 various farmers' organisations. The committee was formed with the integration of 130 farmers' organisation after the death of six farmers in alleged police firing in Mandsaur, Madhya Pradesh in June 2017.

Major constituents 
 All India Kisan Sabha (Ajoy Bhavan)
 All India Kisan Sabha (Ashoka Road)
 All India Kisan Mahasabha (AIKM)
 Punjab Kisan Union
 Andhra Pradesh Vyavsaya Vruthidarula Union
 Bharatiya Kisan Union (Dakaunda)
 Karnataka Rajya Raitha Sangha
 National Alliance of People's Movements (NAPM)
 Narmada Bachao Andolan
 Swabhimani Shetkari Saghtana
 Swaraj Abhiyan
All India Krishak Khet Majdoor Sangathan (AIKKMS)

References 

Farms
Agricultural organisations based in India
2017 establishments in Delhi
Organisers of 2020–2021 Indian farmers' protest